Mick Dyche (4 October 1951 – 21 December 2018) was an English rock and folk guitarist, and former member of 1970s soft rock band Sniff 'n' the Tears. He was known for playing guitar on their only major hit "Driver's Seat", for which he also provided the opening guitar riff, as credited by former bandmate Laurence "Loz" Netto in a 2005 interview with Lars Hindsley.

Born in Burton upon Trent, Staffordshire, England, he had appeared on Wild Turkey's 1972 album, Turkey, as a guitarist and vocalist; on Tim Rose's 1975 LP The Musician; and on Snips' 1978 LP Video King; before joining Sniff 'n' the Tears.

After Sniff 'n' the Tears, Dyche played live and recorded with a range of bands and musicians, including the Pat Travers Band, Noel McCalla, John Illsley, The Hank Wangford Band and The Maddy Prior Band.  He also rejoined Glenn Cornick's band Wild Turkey, for some time circa 2006, and, more recently, he played with the Burton upon Trent-based band Mona Leeza.

Death
Mick Dyche died on 21 December 2018, in Hereford. He had been diagnosed with cancer in February that same year.

References

External links
Sniff 'n the Tears: Mick Dyche in the 1978 line-up 

NME.com feature on Pat Travers Band
Wild Turkey web page
Mick Dyche with Wild Turkey in 2006
 Mick Dyche discography

English folk guitarists
English rock guitarists
English male guitarists
People from Burton upon Trent
1951 births
2018 deaths
20th-century English musicians
20th-century British male musicians